Pradosia atroviolacea is a species of plant in the family Sapotaceae. It is found in Brazil, Colombia, and Peru.

References

atroviolacea
Near threatened plants
Taxonomy articles created by Polbot